The Beijing Organizing Committee for the Games of the XXIX Olympiad, or BOCOG, also known as the Beijing Organizing Committee, was an informal name for the Beijing Organizing Committee for the Games of the XXIX Olympiad. It was also the organizing committee for the Games of the XIII Paralympiad. The President of BOCOG was Liu Qi (）, the then CPC secretary of Beijing Municipality.

On January 28, 2008, BOCOG took control of the Water Cube.

On August 22, 2009, BOCOG is officially dissolved. Its official website is now used by the Beijing Olympic City Development Association.

Gallery

References

2008 Summer Olympics
2008 Summer Paralympics
Organising Committees for the Olympic Games
Organising Committees for the Paralympic Games
Summer Olympics
Sport in Beijing